Exodus is an American thrash metal band formed in 1979 in Richmond, California. Their current lineup consists of guitarists Gary Holt and Lee Altus, bassist Jack Gibson, drummer Tom Hunting, and lead vocalist Steve "Zetro" Souza. There are no original members left in Exodus other than Hunting, who has departed from the band twice, in 1989 and 2004, but rejoined in 2007. Exodus is also notable for its inclusion of guitarist Kirk Hammett in its initial lineup; he eventually left the band in 1983 to join Metallica as Dave Mustaine's replacement. Holt, who replaced original guitarist Tim Agnello in 1981, has been most consistent member throughout various lineup changes and break-ups, and is the only member to appear on all of Exodus' recordings. Much of the band's career has also been affected by bitter feuds between both band members and record companies, two extended hiatuses, deaths of former band members and internal problems often relating to drugs.

Since its formation, Exodus has released eleven studio albums, two live albums, one compilation album, and a re-recording of their first album. Along with Metallica, they are often credited as pioneers of the Bay Area thrash metal scene, and have been referred to as one of the region's so-called "big six" alongside Testament, Death Angel, Lååz Rockit, Forbidden and Vio-lence. Exodus have sold over five million albums worldwide, and they are also considered to be one of the "big eight" of thrash metal, along with Metallica, Megadeth, Slayer, Anthrax, Testament, Overkill and Death Angel. The band had particular success in the mid-to-late 1980s with their first three studio albums: Bonded by Blood (1985), Pleasures of the Flesh (1987) and Fabulous Disaster (1989). The critical praise given to Fabulous Disaster garnered attention from major labels, including Capitol Records, with whom Exodus signed in 1989 and released two albums for the label: Impact Is Imminent (1990) and Force of Habit (1992). After a break up in 1993 and a short-lived reunion during 1997–1998, Exodus reunited once again in 2001, and since then, they have released six more studio albums, starting with and including Tempo of the Damned (2004), which reignited Exodus' popularity and is considered to be a key part in the early-to-mid-2000s thrash metal revival movement. The band's eleventh and latest studio album, Persona Non Grata, was released on November 19, 2021. Exodus is currently working on new material for their next album for a 2023 or 2024 release.

History

Formation and early years (1979–1984)

The initial lineup of Exodus was formed in the late 1970s by guitarists Kirk Hammett and Tim Agnello, drummer/vocalist Tom Hunting, and vocalist Keith Stewart, while they attended high school together. The band added bass guitarist Carlton Melson in 1980, and the quintet began making a name for themselves playing backyard parties and various school functions. They played mostly cover songs in the vein of 1970s hard rock and new wave of British heavy metal (NWOBHM) acts but also developed some of their own original songs. Stewart soon left the band and Hunting became the band's sole vocalist for some time. Carlton Melson was replaced in 1981 by bass guitarist Jeff Andrews. Tim Agnello would also leave the group, moving to New York City and staying involved in the music industry as a guitar player, manager, and writer. This left Exodus to perform as a power trio until a replacement was found in Hammett's friend and Exodus roadie Gary Holt.

Also in 1981, Hammett met El Cerrito resident Paul Baloff at a North Berkeley house party, a friendship that was started – according to Hammett – by their shared admiration for punk rock and 1970s heavy metal music. Baloff became the band's lead vocalist and the quintet recorded a 3-track demo tape in 1982 consisting of the songs "Whipping Queen", "Death and Domination" and "Warlord", a release which would be Hammett's only recording with Exodus until 2014. The band's music began to incorporate elements of hardcore punk into their NWOBHM roots, and Exodus was considered a pioneer of the Bay Area thrash metal scene. In November 1982, Exodus opened a show at San Francisco's Old Waldorf venue for Metallica, a then-relatively unknown (and unsigned) band from Los Angeles. As the band began playing more shows in Bay Area clubs, they gained a large, fervent fan base known for their violent concert behavior.

In early 1983, Hammett left Exodus to join Metallica on the recommendation of manager and producer Mark Whitaker, leaving Gary Holt to effectively take creative control of the band. Hammett was replaced short term by Mike Maung, followed by Evan McCaskey, before the band finally found a permanent replacement in guitarist Rick Hunolt. Jeff Andrews also left to start an early incarnation of pioneering death metal band Possessed, and was replaced by bass guitarist Rob McKillop.

In the spring of 1984, Exodus entered Turk Street Studios with producer Doug Piercy to record demos of songs that would later appear on their debut album. The band was signed to New York-based Torrid Records and Exodus prepared to enter Prairie Sun Recording Studios that summer.

Bonded by Blood and rise in popularity (1984–1991)

The band recorded their first album, Bonded by Blood, in the summer of 1984 with the band's manager Mark Whitaker producing. Concert photos from 1984 showing them at Aquatic Park's Eastern Front Metal Festival (with Slayer and Suicidal Tendencies) and at Ruthie's Inn (with Megadeth and Slayer) were included on the album sleeve inserts. Originally titled A Lesson in Violence, the album was not released until April 1985 amidst creative and business setbacks. Whilst Bonded By Blood is considered a highly influential thrash metal album today, critics have regarded the delay in its release as having hindered the impact the album could have had. As Allmusic reviewer Eduardo Rivadavia would later write in his review for the album: "Had it been released immediately after it was recorded in 1984, Exodus' Bonded by Blood might be regarded today alongside Metallica's Kill 'Em All as one of the landmark albums responsible for launching the thrash metal wave." Exodus promoted the album by going on tour with Venom and Slayer. Four songs from their performance of April 5, 1985 at Studio 54 in New York City were filmed and released on home video as Combat Tour Live: The Ultimate Revenge. The band subsequently toured or played selected shows with Exciter, Megadeth, Anthrax, King Diamond, Possessed, D.R.I., Nuclear Assault and Hirax.

Shortly after touring for Bonded by Blood was complete, Paul Baloff was fired from the band allegedly due to his behavior related to alcohol and substance abuse. He was replaced by Steve "Zetro" Souza, who had previously been the lead vocalist for Legacy, an early incarnation of fellow Bay Area thrashers Testament. Baloff went on to form the band Piranha in 1987.

Exodus' lineup remained stable for the recording of their next two albums, and the underground success attained with Bonded by Blood would lead to the group's signing to Sony/Combat Records, who released the band's second effort Pleasures of the Flesh in October 1987. The album was engineered by a then-unknown Sylvia Massy, who would go on to produce two releases by progressive metal band Tool. In support of Pleasures of the Flesh, Exodus toured with Anthrax, Celtic Frost, M.O.D., Lȧȧz Rockit and Testament.

The group's third full-length album, Fabulous Disaster, was released in January 1989. A music video for the song "The Toxic Waltz" would receive consistent rotation on MTV's Headbangers Ball. Promotion for the album included Exodus embarking on the Headbangers Ball Tour with Anthrax and Helloween, which brought the band to a wider audience. Early in the tour, drummer Tom Hunting left the band for health and personal reasons. Vio-lence drummer Perry Strickland was quickly brought into the fold as a temporary replacement for the remainder of the tour. Drummer John Tempesta would fill the position on a permanent basis until the band's first breakup in 1993. Fabulous Disaster reached No. 82 on the Billboard 200 chart.

After the success of Fabulous Disaster, Exodus signed a multi-album deal with Capitol Records in 1989. The band's fourth album Impact is Imminent was released in June 1990. Despite being released on a major label, Impact Is Imminent was not as successful as Fabulous Disaster and debuted at No. 137 on the Billboard 200. Until the release of Blood In, Blood Out in 2014, Impact Is Imminent would be Exodus' last album to enter the charts. Exodus spent the latter half of 1990 touring in support of the album, including the U.S. with Suicidal Tendencies and Pantera. Due to their label refusing to pay tour support, the world tour for Impact for Imminent was cut short; they were originally slated to tour Europe with Annihilator and Judas Priest as part of the latter's Painkiller tour (where Exodus was replaced by Pantera), and the band was also reportedly intended to be the replacement for Death Angel as the support act of the Clash of the Titans tour in North America with Megadeth, Slayer and Anthrax before the offer went to Alice in Chains.

In 1991, the band released their first live album, Good Friendly Violent Fun, which was recorded during their 1989 tour.

Force of Habit, hiatus, and first reunion (1991–2000)

After the release of Good Friendly Violent Fun, the band toured sporadically for a year. Bass guitarist McKillop was replaced by Michael Butler before the group recorded and released their next studio album titled Force of Habit in 1992. This album was something of a departure from the band's signature sound, containing several slower, "heavier" songs with less emphasis on the thrash aspect of their older material. The 11-minute song "Architect of Pain" is a good example of the change of direction, having a much slow and progressive, grinding feel than the usual high tempo thrash they had become known for. After touring for Force of Habit was completed, behind-the-scenes issues as well as a changing musical environment prompted the band to split up.

Holt and Hunting formed the groove / thrash metal outfit Wardance in the mid-1990s playing several shows around the Bay Area and recording a four-song demo, but the group never gained momentum and eventually disbanded.

Holt and Hunting reunited with Paul Baloff and Rick Hunolt for a short Exodus tour in 1997. The lineup was completed with Wardance bassist Jack Gibson. They released a live album titled Another Lesson in Violence recorded at the Trocadero Transfer in front of a home town audience. However, the group disbanded again the following year, in part due to a falling out with record label Century Media over the way promotion for the live album was handled, and over an aborted attempt at a live concert video which was filmed but never released due to a financial dispute.

Second reunion, Tempo of the Damned, and switching singers (2001–2004)
In 2001, Exodus reformed once again with the 1997 lineup, initially to play the Chuck Billy and Chuck Schuldiner benefit Thrash of the Titans concert. There was talk of recording a new studio album and the band continued to play shows in and around the San Francisco Bay Area.

However, on February 2, 2002, Paul Baloff died after suffering a stroke. Former vocalist Steve Souza was brought back into the band to finish the rest of their concert commitments. Although it appeared to outsiders that with Baloff's death Exodus would cease to exist, guitarist Gary Holt was determined to release a new studio album. The result was 2004's Tempo of the Damned released on Nuclear Blast Records. An oddity of the recording sessions was that one track, "Crime of the Century", was dropped under mysterious circumstances. The song chronicled Exodus's time under Century Media (of which Nuclear Blast is a subsidiary). Although it was publicly denied, rumors swirled that Century Media forced the song off the record. "Crime of the Century" was replaced with "Impaler", a song which was written when Kirk Hammett was still in the band, and was previously featured on the Another Lesson in Violence live record. Despite selling fewer than 15,000 copies in its first year of release, Tempo of the Damned received generally positive reviews from fans and critics alike, and is now considered to be an important part of the 2000s thrash metal revival movement. Throughout 2004, Exodus toured worldwide in support of the album.

Steve Souza once again left the band due to business and personal differences in 2004. This led to a feud between himself and Gary Holt, who subsequently issued a statement in which he was heavily critical of Souza, claiming he had suddenly left the band while on tour only a day before they were due to leave for a show in Mexico City. In retrospective accounts, both Holt and Souza stated that the reasons for the split were primarily financial: Souza had a full time job as a union carpenter having to care for his family, but his managers posed him an ultimatum as a result of his continued absence from his day job due to touring.

Exhumed frontman Matt Harvey filled in for the Mexico City date and Steev Esquivel (ex-Defiance and Skinlab) played on the fall South American dates. The band eventually found a permanent replacement in Rob Dukes.

Rob Dukes era (2005–2014)

In 2005, Rick Hunolt left the band to focus on his family. He was replaced by Heathen guitarist Lee Altus. Tom Hunting also took leave of the band following a re-occurrence of the nervous problems that led to his temporary departure in 1989. Hunting was replaced with Paul Bostaph who had previously played with Slayer and Testament. The revamped lineup released the album Shovel Headed Kill Machine in 2005. The tour for the album led to extensive travel of the US, Europe, and Japan, as well as their first-ever visit to Australia.

Tom Hunting returned to the band in March 2007 in time to record and release their 8th studio album The Atrocity Exhibition... Exhibit A. They performed at the Wacken Open Air Festival in the summer of 2008. In April 2009, Exodus embarked on a co-headlining North American tour with Kreator and also featuring Belphegor, Warbringer, and Epicurean. Exodus then went on tour supporting Arch Enemy along with Arsis and Mutiny Within.

Exodus provided the voices of the customers at the Duncan Hills Coffee Shop and five of the sick people in Cartoon Network's Metalocalypse.

Exodus released a re-recording of their 1985 debut album Bonded by Blood entitled Let There Be Blood in 2008. Gary Holt released the following statement about the band's decision to revisit their debut album: "After many years in the planning and discussion stage, we have finally completed the re-recording of 'Bonded By Blood'. We have decided to call it 'Let There Be Blood' and it is our way of paying homage to [late singer] Paul Baloff by showing how relevant these songs we had written together still are. We aren't trying to replace the original; that's impossible anyway. We are just giving these songs the benefit of modern production. It's something we talked about before Paul's death and it's always been important to us to do. We were super excited about entering the studio once again to record these classics, and now it's back to writing the next studio record!"

The album Exhibit B: The Human Condition was recorded in northern California with British producer Andy Sneap (Megadeth, Arch Enemy, Kreator) and released on Nuclear Blast Records in May 2010. The band was included on Megadeth's Rust in Peace 20th Anniversary tour along with Testament. Exodus was featured on the cover of Decibel magazine's June 2010 issue, with a feature article on them.

Exodus co-headlined with Kreator, Suicidal Angels and Death Angel on the Thrashfest tour in late 2010 and were one of the headlining bands at Wacken Open Air 2011.

Exodus toured with Rob Zombie and Slayer in 2011 on their Hell on Earth tour as the opening act. Gary Holt filled in for Slayer guitarist Jeff Hanneman during the tour after Hanneman contracted necrotizing fasciitis caused by a spider bite. Holt filled in for Hanneman again on Slayer's next tour in the summer of 2012. When Exodus also toured in the summer of 2012, guitarist Rick Hunolt (who left Exodus in 2005) filled in for Holt. Cannibal Corpse guitarist Pat O'Brien also filled in for Holt during this time. Upon Hanneman's death in 2013, Holt became his permanent replacement but assured fans that Exodus would continue.

On February 4, 2012, a Paul Baloff Memorial Reunion Concert was held at the Oakland Metro Opera House. Former and current Exodus members in attendance included Kirk Hammett, Rick Hunolt, Gary Holt, Jeff Andrews, Lee Altus, Rob Dukes, Tom Hunting and Jack Gibson. It was the first time they had all played together since 1983. The band was confirmed for the Graspop Festival and for the Hellfest in June 2012. By the summer of 2012, Exodus had begun writing new material for their tenth studio album. On March 27, it was announced that the band entered the studio and were well into recording drum tracks, and the album was expected for a fall 2014 release.

Reunion with Steve Souza (2014–present)
On June 8, 2014, Exodus announced that vocalist Rob Dukes had left the band, and was replaced by Steve "Zetro" Souza, making this the second time he had rejoined the band. Souza stepped in to record vocals for the new album, the first to feature him since 2004's Tempo of the Damned. The bands tenth studio album Blood In, Blood Out, was released on October 14, 2014. Original guitarist and founding member Kirk Hammett made a guest appearance on the song "Salt the Wound", marking his first recording with Exodus since the 1982 demo. The album received positive reviews from music critics upon its release, and peaked at  38 on the Billboard 200, making it the band's highest chart position to that point. Heathen guitarist Kragen Lum was brought in to replace Gary Holt for several live dates while Holt performed and recorded with Slayer. Exodus toured throughout 2015 in support of Blood In, Blood Out, performing at that year's edition of Australian Soundwave Festival, which was held across two weekends, and along with Shattered Sun, they supported Testament on their Dark Roots of Thrash II tour in the spring. Exodus then toured around Europe in June, including two nights at the Underworld in London.

Writing for the band's follow-up to Blood In, Blood Out began as early as 2016, but actual recording of the album was uncertain due to Holt's involvement with Slayer. In 2017, drummer Tom Hunting said that the band had several songs written, with the remainder still being worked on. Souza explained that the material did not sound like a continuation of Blood In, Blood Out, but rather "a lot of records put together". Hunting said that the album could include another appearance by Kirk Hammett and a possible guest appearance by former guitarist Rick Hunolt. Progress was slow in the coming years, mostly interrupted by both Exodus' constant touring and Holt's commitment to Slayer's farewell tour. Recording of the band's eleventh studio album began in September 2020. Holt revealed on Instagram two months later that the title of album would be Persona Non Grata and it would be released in June 2021.

Former members Rick Hunolt and Rob Dukes joined the band on stage for a one-off reunion show in July 2017. Exodus appeared at the 2018 edition of the Rockharz Open Air in Germany, as one of the early bands on the main stage. The band also headlined the 2018 installment of the MTV Headbangers Ball European Tour (along with Death Angel, Suicidal Angels and Sodom) from late November to mid-December 2018, and toured Europe with Testament and Death Angel in February and March 2020 by taking part in The Bay Strikes Back tour.

On April 13, 2021, three days after his 56th birthday, it was announced that drummer Tom Hunting had been diagnosed with squamous cell carcinoma of the stomach. As the result of his health issues, the band also announced that the release of Persona Non Grata would be delayed to November 2021. Exodus supported the album with a spring 2022 tour in North America with Testament and Death Angel, as part of the Bay Strikes Back tour, which was initially supposed to take place in the fall of 2021 but the COVID pandemic meant postponing the tour to next year. While Hunting was recovering from his cancer surgery, the band recruited drummer John Tempesta for the August 22 show in Las Vegas and the September 11 show in Cave-In-Rock. Hunting rejoined Exodus for their appearance at the Aftershock Festival in Sacramento on October 7, 2021. The band continued to tour behind Persona Non Grata in Europe and North America throughout the summer and fall of 2022, again with Testament and Death Angel, followed by another North American tour in January and February 2023 with Anthrax and Black Label Society. Due to "family concerns", guitarist Lee Altus did not participate in the European tour, and he was filled in by Brandon Ellis of The Black Dahlia Murder.

About two weeks after the release of Persona Non Grata, Holt spoke to The Aquarian Weekly about a potential follow-up album. When the interviewer reminded him to "be careful about losing [his] cell phone", in reference to a similar incident in which Metallica and original Exodus guitarist Kirk Hammett lost his cell phone containing riffs that he had recorded for Hardwired... to Self-Destruct, Holt responded: "I have my stuff backed up, but if I lose my phone, I wouldn't care. I've used the stuff I have really wanted to and by the time we do the next album, I'll probably record another thousand riffs that I don't listen back to." In a December 2021 interview with Guitar.com, Holt promised that there will not be another seven-year gap in between studio albums.

Musical style, legacy and influences

Exodus have been credited as one of the pioneers of the thrash metal genre, which achieved mainstream popularity in the 1980s and early 1990s, and is often credited as the first Bay Area thrash metal band to exist, predating Metallica, who were originally from Los Angeles. Exodus is also considered to be a member of the "big eight" of the genre, along with Metallica, Megadeth, Slayer, Anthrax, Testament, Overkill and Death Angel. Alternatively, Exodus have been called one of "the other big four" or "second big four" of thrash metal, alongside Testament, Overkill and Death Angel.

The members of Exodus have cited numerous artists as an influence or inspiration to their sound, including AC/DC, Angel Witch, Black Sabbath, David Bowie, Roy Buchanan, Glen Campbell, The Clash, Ry Cooder, Deep Purple, Diamond Head, Discharge, The Doors, The Exploited, GBH, Jimi Hendrix, Iron Maiden, Elton John, Judas Priest, Led Zeppelin, Mercyful Fate, Gary Moore, Motörhead, Nazareth, Ted Nugent, Pink Floyd, Queen, Rainbow, the Sex Pistols, Sweet Savage, Thin Lizzy, Tygers of Pan Tang, UFO, Van Halen, Stevie Ray Vaughan and Venom.

Multiple thrash metal bands, including Slayer, Anthrax, Testament, Death Angel, Vio-lence, Flotsam and Jetsam, Heathen, Artillery, Havok, and Evile, as well as other bands such as Darkthrone, Cannibal Corpse, Fear Factory, Eyehategod and Primal Fear, have cited Exodus as an influence or inspiration to their music.

Loudwire.com placed Exodus at number five on its list of the 10 Best Thrash Bands of All Time, calling them "The original kings of the Bay Area thrash scene", and saying that "While their uncompromising sound and uneven output in the coming decades kept world domination and platinum success ever at bay, you'd be hard passed to finger any other band, short of Slayer, perhaps, that's flown the thrash flag as proudly and unwaveringly as Exodus." In 1989, Brad Tolinski of Guitar World magazine wrote that, "If Exodus is a speed metal equivalent of the Rolling Stones, then New York-based Anthrax must surely be the genre's The Beatles." In 2002, Jon Wiederhorn of MTV noted that Exodus "was instrumental in pioneering thrash metal — a style of music that blended the fury of hardcore and the razor-edged precision of such British bands as Iron Maiden and Judas Priest — and soon became the toast of the Bay Area metal scene, which also included Metallica, Testament, Flotsam & Jetsam and Death Angel." Ultimate Guitar also referred to Exodus as "one of the historical bridges between 'The Big Four' of thrash (Metallica, Megadeth, Slayer, and Anthrax) and the genre's second wave in the late 1980s."

"Big Four" debate
It has been debated whether or not Exodus belongs in the "Big Five" of thrash metal with Metallica, Megadeth, Slayer and Anthrax, due to their involvement with the early 1980s thrash metal scene. VH1 stated, "Much is made of Thrash's Big Four: Metallica, Slayer, Megadeth, and Anthrax. True devotees know, however, that Big Five is the actual proper figure and that Exodus is the band that completes the quintet." Anthrax guitarist Scott Ian also stated that, "People talk about the 'Big Four' all the time, but back then it was really the 'Big Five' because Exodus were just as important and just as influential as everybody else." Megadeth founder Dave Mustaine said in a 1990 interview that, in his point of view, the "Big Four" were Exodus, Slayer, Metallica and Megadeth, adding that "Exodus are a much better band – I really like Exodus. Gary Holt and Rick Hunolt are really great guitar players. I like Scott Ian, but anyone else in that band kind of bores me. Having a disco thing is not what I think having a metal band is all about, and that guy had the audacity to say that he and I should work together! I felt like saying what are you planning to do? Open a disco fashion shop?" Mustaine was also quoted saying, "You know, people will say there's a whole other generation, like the 'Medium Four' [laughs], and I think there's a lot of great bands that fit that bill, too. But I think probably Exodus, because there was nobody else at the time that had that kind of pull or that kind of importance in the metal community. Granted, it was with Baloff, and Baloff had a voice that you had to have an acquired taste for, but you know, I liked him."

In addition to Ian and Mustaine, Holt has agreed that Exodus should be included in the "Big Five" of thrash metal because they "were there at the start of thrash metal with Metallica in the real early '80s. Same thing with Megadeth because Mustaine was a part of Metallica's birth and he also created Megadeth." Frontman Steve "Zetro" Souza has stated that the fact that Exodus was not included in the "Big Four" does not bother him, "I've heard that term many times and it doesn't really matter to me. It's not the truth. There's them, and Overkill, Testament and Exodus. You could also talk about Kreator, Sodom and Destruction, if you want to get down to it. It doesn't bother me — I'm content where I'm at."

Band members

Current members
 Tom Hunting – drums (1979–1989, 1997–1998, 2001–2005, 2007–present), lead vocals (1979–1982)
 Gary Holt – guitars, backing vocals (1981–1993, 1997–1998, 2001–present)
 Steve "Zetro" Souza – lead vocals (1986–1993, 2002–2004, 2014–present)
 Jack Gibson – bass, backing vocals (1997–1998, 2001–present)
 Lee Altus – guitars (2005–present)

Discography

 Bonded by Blood (1985)
 Pleasures of the Flesh (1987)
 Fabulous Disaster (1989)
 Impact Is Imminent (1990)
 Force of Habit (1992)
 Tempo of the Damned (2004)
 Shovel Headed Kill Machine (2005)
 The Atrocity Exhibition... Exhibit A (2007)
 Let There Be Blood (2008)
 Exhibit B: The Human Condition (2010)
 Blood In, Blood Out (2014)
 Persona Non Grata (2021)

References

External links

 

1979 establishments in California
Thrash metal musical groups from California
Capitol Records artists
Century Media Records artists
Combat Records artists
Musical groups from the San Francisco Bay Area
Musical groups established in 1979
Musical groups disestablished in 1993
Musical groups reestablished in 1997
Musical groups disestablished in 1998
Musical groups reestablished in 2001
Musical quintets
Nuclear Blast artists
Political music groups